In organic chemistry, ethylenedioxy is a functional group with the structural formula R-O-CH2-CH2-O-R'. It is often attached to an aromatic ring. 

Examples:
3,4-Ethylenedioxythiophene, a precursor to conductive polymer
EDMA, an illicit analogue of methamphetamine.
(ethylenedioxy)dimethanol, a biocidal formaldehyde releaser.

See also 
 1,3-Benzodioxole
 1,4-Benzodioxine

Alkoxy groups